Beth Elliott (born 1950) is an American trans lesbian folk singer, activist, and writer. In the early 1970s Elliot was involved with the Daughters of Bilitis and the West Coast Lesbian Conference in California. She became the centre of a controversy when a minority of attendees in the 1973 Conference, including a keynote speaker, called for her removal because of her trans status.

Daughters of Bilitis
Elliott served as vice-president of the San Francisco chapter of the lesbian political group Daughters of Bilitis from 1971 to 1972, during which she served as editor of the chapter's newsletter, Sisters. When she first joined in 1971, her right to join was heatedly debated because of her sex. Yet she was accepted and served until late 1972 when accusations of sexual harassment from former friend, lesbian separatist, and feminist activist, Bev Jo Von Dohre, led to a decisive vote. The result was 35 to 28 against the inclusion of Elliott, or any trans women, in the San Francisco chapter of the DOB. When Del Martin announced the 35–28 vote, the editorial staff of Sisters walked out, leaving the group over the decision.

West Coast Lesbian Conference
Beth Elliott continued her involvement in the women's movement and helped to create the West Coast Lesbian Conference which took place in April 1973. She was on the organization committee and was asked to perform as a singer in the conference's entertainment program. However, on the first night when she took the stage she met considerable opposition. Lesbian separatist group, The Gutter Dykes, had leafleted in protest of Elliott's presence, claiming she was a man, and approached the stage with hostility. Other performers, Jeanne Cordova, Robin Tyler, and Patty Harrison, have stated that they responded by defending Elliott and established the need for a vote on whether Elliott's performance should continue. It took over an hour to count the roughly 1,300 attendees and resulted in a reported two-thirds in favor of Elliott's performance. Some accounts state 3:1 in Elliott’s favor while others state it as a bare majority. Elliott gave a brief performance and went on to leave the conference.
The following day, keynote speaker Robin Morgan gave her address, which she had altered after the events of the previous night. In the speech, titled "Lesbianism and Feminism: Synonyms or Contradictions?" Morgan referred to Elliott as a "gatecrashing...male transvestite" and, using male pronouns, charged her as "an opportunist, an infiltrator, and a destroyer-with the mentality of a rapist."

Post-conference
The incident at the West Coast Lesbian Conference, the largest lesbian gathering precedented, left a lasting impression. Not only was Elliott emotionally and socially scarred, but the words defaming her circulated among grassroots lesbian networks and began the 'transsexual rapist' trope." The event was the first time many feminists encountered the question of trans women's inclusion in the movement. Elliott was left ostracized from much of the women's and lesbian community due to the controversial division emerging among feminists.

Life and career
Beth Elliott has been publishing since the mid 1970s on bisexuality, feminism, the AIDS movement, sex positivity, and transgenderism. Additionally, Elliott is the author of several books published by ENC Press. Her 1996 memoir, Mirrors: Portrait of a Lesbian Transsexual, was described as a “classic in lesbian feminist and transgender/transsexual literary history” by the Bay Area Reporter. She reprised the book in 2011, adding a new introduction and afterword as well as a chapter recounting of her experience at the West Coast Lesbian Conference. She is also the author of the science fiction novel, Don’t Call it “Virtual” published in 2003.

She has been involved in political work in support of gay rights and co-founded the Alice B. Toklas LGBT Club. She was elected as a board member for the California Committee for Sexual Law Reform which, in 1975, supported Willie Brown to pass legislation repealing anti-gay sodomy laws in California.

She has been a folk musician since the late 1960s and was active in the Haight-Ashbury hippie music scene in the 1970s. Her latest work is the album entitled "Buried Treasure," released independently in 2005.

References

1950 births
American lesbian writers
American lesbian musicians
American LGBT singers
Transfeminists
Transgender rights activists
Transgender women musicians
Living people
LGBT people from California
Feminist musicians
20th-century American LGBT people
21st-century American LGBT people
Transgender singers
American transgender writers